Dragotina (Greek: Δραγωτινά), also with the o accented  is a village in the western part of the island of Corfu.  It is located in the municipal district of Neochori and the municipality of Lefkimmi.  Its 2001 population was 274 for the settlement  Dragotina is located east-southeast of the city of Corfu.

It located on the south of Corfu Island 45,5 km from town and near Spartera, 50 metres above the sea level. This is a village invisible from the sea in order to be protected from the intruders in the past. It is first mentioned in 1473.  Dragotina was named after the surname Dragotis or Draotis, or even Draonis.  This is one version of the story, the other is that  it was named after the village Dragoti in Thesprotia,  from a place where a great number of people had to move to Corfu. According to a different notion the village’s name means  ‘dragatis’ translated as rural police.  A final version is the Slav name Dragotino. 
The village used to be near Spartera at the foot of Taxiarchis hill  towards the lower Klismata. In the area the sandy beach Kanoula is found.

Famous surnames of the 16th century are Vlachopoulos, Grantos in 1507, Vamvakas, Gardikiotis, Therianos, Kontomaris, Mihalitzis, Vlassis, Melahrinos, Smoilis, and Arvanitis.

In a census in 1583 there is a reference of the village but no reference of residents. In 1684 the village consisted of 10 families; in 1781 there were 42 residents; in 1879 there were 102 residents; a census in 2001 showed 274 residents.

Nearest place

Neochori

Population

See also

List of settlements in the Corfu prefecture

External links
 Dragotina GTP Travel Pages

Lefkimmi
Villages in Greece